The 2015 Catalunya GP3 Series round was a GP3 Series motor race held on May 9 and 10, 2015 at Circuit de Catalunya, Montmeló, Spain. It was the first round of the 2015 GP3 Series. The race supported the 2015 Spanish Grand Prix.

Luca Ghiotto took pole position and Esteban Ocon took the victory in the feature race, while Marvin Kirchhöfer took the victory in the sprint race.

Classification

Qualifying

Feature Race

Sprint Race

See also 
 2015 Spanish Grand Prix
 2015 Catalunya GP2 Series round

References

External links
 

2015 GP3 round reports
2015 in Spanish motorsport
May 2015 sports events in Spain